Kiryat Sanz (also spelled Kiriat Tzanz) is a Haredi neighborhood located at the northwestern end of Netanya, Israel. Founded in 1956 by the previous Klausenburger Rebbe, Rabbi Yekusiel Yehudah Halberstam, who established his court here in 1960, Kiryat Sanz is the world center for Sanz-Klausenburg Hasidism. The Rebbe's son and successor, Rabbi Zvi Elimelech Halberstam, known as the Sanzer Rebbe, holds his court here.

History
In the 1950s, as the nascent State of Israel began building its population, the Klausenburger Rebbe — who had emigrated to the United States in 1947 after surviving The Holocaust and living in displaced persons camps — applied to the Israeli government for land on which to build a Hasidic settlement for Holocaust survivors. The Rebbe's goals in founding Kiryat Sanz were to restore the former glory of Sanz Hasidism that had been wiped out by the Holocaust, and to establish a model of Torah living which would illuminate the surrounding secular environs.

Many Torah leaders counseled the Rebbe as to where he should establish his new community — some suggested the outskirts of Safed, others Beer Sheva, and still others Jerusalem. The Rebbe set up his own action committee, which recommended two sites on the Mediterranean coast in and around Netanya, and the Rebbe chose the land on the Netanya beachfront. According to Rabbi Eliyahu Shmuel Schmerler, rosh yeshiva of the Sanz yeshiva in Netanya and a long-time confidante of the Rebbe, "The Rebbe mentioned at the time that the day would come when people would not say 'Kiryat Sanz—that’s near Netanya,' but that 'Netanya was near Kiryat Sanz'". 

The purchase price of the land was covered with part of a $1 million check that the Rebbe had received from the City of New York, which was planning to build a new road in place of the ageing buildings occupied by the Rebbe's Yesodei HaTorah school in Brooklyn. The first deposit was made on 30 September (3 Tishrei) 1954 and toasted in the Rebbe's Williamsburg home at the end of that day, after the conclusion of the Fast of Gedalia. In later years, the Israel Land Administration would grant additional acreage to the budding community.

On 4 March (21 Adar) 1956, the Rebbe returned to Israel to lay the cornerstone for Kiryat Sanz in the presence of thousands of religious Jews, many of them Sanzer Hasidim and others Holocaust survivors who had known the Rebbe from Germany. He delivered a lengthy speech expounding on the holiness of the Land of Israel and encouraging more Jews to settle here. He also outlined his vision for the new village:

Hundreds of families will move to Kiryat Sanz from abroad and establish roots here, living their lives according to our holy Torah and our tradition. In the center of the city there will be a yeshivah and educational institutions for both boys and girls, to educate them in Torah and fear of Heaven. We will build businesses and factories that will provide the families who move here with an honorable livelihood and steady income.

Today is a day of great celebration for me. I have often thought to myself, "Why did I remain among the living? Why did I alone survive from my entire family?" Today I know clearly that everything happened so that I should merit to lay, with my very own hands, the cornerstone of Kiryat Sanz in the Land of Israel.

Thereafter the Rebbe began planning all the infrastructure for his community, including kindergartens, boys' and girls' schools, yeshivas, seminaries, synagogues, a children's home for orphaned and needy girls, an old-age home, and a hospital. In 1958 he laid the cornerstone for both the old-age home and the hospital; the former was completed in 1960, while the latter, which became known as Laniado Hospital, did not open until 1975. In addition to religious services, the new settlement had a diamond polishing factory built by a New York diamond merchant.

The Rebbe, his family, and 50 followers made aliyah to Kiryat Sanz on 20 December (19 Kislev) 1959. From then on, the Rebbe celebrated the 19th of Kislev as a personal holiday. Thereafter he divided his time between his home in Kiryat Sanz and the yeshiva community which he established in Union City, New Jersey in 1968 for young men who could not move to Israel. He died in Kiryat Sanz on 18 June 1994.

Kiryat Sanz today

Today Kiryat Sanz has a population of approximately 600 families. Most of the older generation are Holocaust survivors. Besides its educational facilities for boys and girls from elementary to post-graduate, it has five synagogues, a mikveh, a printing house, a religious hotel, a religious nursing school, and the Laniado Hospital, which encompasses two medical centers, a children’s hospital, a geriatric center and a nursing school, serving a regional population of over 450,000.

Befitting its role as a Torah-observant community, Kiryat Sanz is closed to traffic on Shabbat. Its beachfront was also the first in Israel to schedule separate swimming hours for men and women. Notwithstanding its predominant Haredi atmosphere, Kiryat Sanz is known for its tolerance toward non-religious Jews. Much of the credit for the tolerant feeling between Netanya's religious and non-religious populations goes to the Klausenburger Rebbe, who founded Kiryat Sanz and its regional hospital from the desire to give to and benefit others. Observers believe that the example set by Laniado Hospital, which treats patients of all races and backgrounds and does not leave any proselytizing literature in the wards, is responsible for the growth of the religious list in local elections.

Since the Rebbe's death in 1994, his eldest son, Rabbi Zvi Elimelech Halberstam, known as the Sanzer Rebbe, has been the spiritual leader of the Sanz community in Israel. From his home in Kiryat Sanz, he directs the Sanz Torah and chessed organizations in Netanya, Jerusalem, Bnei Brak, Petah Tikva, Haifa, Safed, Ashdod, Modiin, Beitar Illit, and Elad. He is also directly responsible for all the institutions built by his father in Israel, including Laniado Hospital, where he serves as president.

Landmarks
Galei Sanz Hotel
Laniado Hospital

See also
Kiryat Sanz, Jerusalem

References

Sources

External links
https://kiryatsanz.com Official website of Kiryat Sanz, Netanya
Map of Kiryat Sanz, Netanya
10,000 guests attend massive Hasidic wedding

 

Populated places established in 1956
Neighbourhoods of Netanya